The 1986–87 North Carolina Tar Heels men's basketball team represented the University of North Carolina from Chapel Hill, North Carolina.

Led by head coach Dean Smith, the tar heels completed yet another in a long line of impressive seasons, with an ACC Regular Season title, a top five ranked team, and having reached all the way to the Elite Eight in the NCAA tournament.

Roster

Schedule and results

|-
!colspan=9 | Regular Season
|-

|-
!colspan=9 | ACC Tournament
|-

|-
!colspan=9 | NCAA Tournament
|-

Rankings

References

North Carolina Tar Heels men's basketball seasons
North Carolina
North Carolina
Tar
Tar